The torimono sandōgu (also torimono hogu or mitsu dogu) were known as the three tools of arresting.  The torimono sandōgu were three types of pole weapons used by the samurai class and their retainers in feudal Japan during the Edo period.

History
In Edo period Japan the samurai were in charge of police operations; various levels of samurai police with help from non-samurai commoners used many types of non lethal weapons in order to capture suspected criminals for trial. The torimono sandōgu was part of the six tools of the police station (bansho rokugin or keigo roku-go), these were the kanamuchi, kiriko no bo, tetto, sodegarami, tsukubo, and the sasumata. Samurai police were required to have these six tools or weapons on hand to effectively deal with disturbances. The torimono sandōgu were symbols of office and were often displayed in front of police checkpoints or used in processions, especially while convicted prisoners were being led to their execution.

Description and use
The torimono sandōgu consisted of the sodegarami (sleeve entangler), sasumata (spear fork) and tsukubo (push pole). All three implements were mounted on long hardwood poles usually around 2 meters in length, sharp metal barbs or spines attached to metal strips covered one end of these implements to keep the person being captured from grabbing the pole. The opposite end of the pole would have a metal cap, or ishizuki like those found on naginata and other pole weapons. Torimono sandōgu implements were designed to entangle, restrain and obstruct criminals rather than injure them.

See also
 Sasumata
 Sodegarami
 Tsukubō

References

External links

Samurai police weapons
Samurai polearms
Polearms of Japan